"Salil eka salil vika" is the debut single by Finnish rapper Musta Barbaari. Released on 23 August 2013, the song peaked at number one on the Finnish Singles Chart.

Chart performance

References

Finnish hip hop songs
2013 singles
Number-one singles in Finland
2013 songs